Thomas Wilkinson is an English former footballer. He most recently played for Grays Athletic on loan from Lincoln City. In the summer of 2007 Lincoln were forced to release Wilkinson as a broken leg had ended his career aged 21.

He graduated from York St John University in November 2010 with a bachelor's degree in Physiotherapy, after his studies were funded by the Professional Footballers' Association as part of their programme of post-career training for current and former professional footballers and academy players. He now lives in his home town of Lincoln and works as a physiotherapist at Lincoln County Hospital for the United Lincolnshire hospitals NHS trust.

References

External links

Unofficial Tom Wilkinson Profile at The Forgotten Imp
Grays Athletic Profile

Year of birth missing (living people)
Living people
Sportspeople from Lincoln, England
English footballers
Association football midfielders
Lincoln City F.C. players
Grays Athletic F.C. players
Alumni of York St John University
British physiotherapists